Triple Planetary Crises is a terminology and framework adopted by the United Nation system to describe the three intersecting and global environmental crises of:

 Pollution
 Climate crisis
 Biodiversity loss and/or  Ecological crises

The framework is similar to other multidimensional analysis of human impacts on the environment including:

 Global catastrophic risk
 Planatery boundaries

For further information about human impacts on the environment, see:

 Environmental issues

References 

Global environmental issues
Human impact on the environment